John Biggs may refer to:
John Biggs (London politician) (born 1957), British Labour Party politician
John B. Biggs (born 1934), Australian educational psychologist
John H. Biggs (born 1936), American businessman, former chairman and chief executive officer of TIAA-CREF
John Biggs Jr. (1895–1979), U.S. federal judge
John Biggs (MP) (1801–1871), British Member of Parliament for Leicester

See also
John Biggs-Davison (1918–1988), British Conservative Member of Parliament
John Bigg (disambiguation)
John Bigge (disambiguation)